Evermind may refer to:

Evermind (Dune), the title of the leader of Thinking Machines from Dune series
Evermind (album), an album of Amethystium, a Norwegian musical project
A fictional flower in  J. R. R. Tolkien's Middle-earth universe